Cecil Collins may refer to:
 Cecil Collins (artist), English painter and printmaker
 Cecil Collins (American football), American football running back
 Cecil L. Collins, member of the South Carolina House of Representatives